The Endresen Islands are a group of small islands, the highest rising to , lying just north of the Hobbs Islands. They were discovered and named by Discovery Investigations personnel on the William Scoresby in February 1936.

See also 
 List of Antarctic and sub-Antarctic islands

References 

Islands of Mac. Robertson Land